The Uyghur Human Rights Project (abbreviated UHRP) is a research-based advocacy organization located in Washington, D.C. that promotes human rights for Uyghurs. According to the UHRP, its main goal is "promoting human rights and democracy for Uyghurs and others living in East Turkistan" through research-based advocacy. 

Due to the unique challenges that China presents in terms of gathering information in an accurate and timely manner, the group believes that organizations that specifically focus on the Uyghur crisis are especially important, in addition to organizations that focus on human rights more broadly. The organization also hosts events, like panels of experts, to discuss the crisis facing the Uyghurs.

History
Uyghur Human Rights Project was founded in 2004 by the Uyghur American Association, and have eight full-time staff. The project was founded with a grant from the National Endowment for Democracy, and became a 501(c)(3) nonprofit, tax-exempt organization in 2016.

Omer Kanat has been the organization's Executive Director since 2018. He previously served as the World Uyghur Congress (WUC) Vice President from 2006 to 2017, and has also been a WUC Executive Committee Chairman since 2017. Co-founder Nury Turkel also serves as Board Chair, and was appointed by the U.S. House of Representatives Speaker Nancy Pelosi as a commissioner on the U.S. Commission on International Religious Freedom (2019-2022).

The group also joined with fifty other organizations and experts in September 2020 to call on the UN Human Rights Council to appoint a Commission of Inquiry to investigate atrocity crimes against Uyghurs and other Turkic Muslim peoples. In January 2022, the group wrote to Senate Majority Leader Chuck Schumer in support of the Open App Markets Act, arguing that the bill's sideloading protections will help Chinese citizens bypass censorship.

Nomination for Nobel Peace Prize 
In February 2022 two U.S. lawmakers Tom Suozzi of New York and Chris Smith of New Jersey wrote a letter to the Norwegian Nobel Committee saying that the Uyghur Human Rights Project (UHRP) and Campaign for Uyghurs have made significant contributions to building fraternity between nations and promoting peace by defending the human rights of the Uyghur, Kazakh and other predominately Muslim ethnic minorities that the Chinese Communist Party (CCP) has targeted with genocide and other crimes against humanity. Both lawmakers stressed the gravity of the abuses, which include documented instances of mass detention, sexual violence, torture, forced labor, forced abortions, and sterilization of Uyghur Muslims. Rushan Abbas welcomed the nomination and said: “Regardless of the outcome of the nomination, the fact that the Uyghur issue will be discussed along with the Nobel Peace Prize nomination is a great victory for the Uyghur movement.”

Reports
The organization publishes reports and analysis in English and Chinese to defend Uyghurs' civil, political, social, cultural, and economic rights according to international human rights standards.

In July 2020, the UHRP published the report, "'The Happiest Muslims in the World': Disinformation, Propaganda, and the Uyghur Crisis," which analyzes the Chinese Communist Party's counter-narrative  in response to escalating international alarm about human rights violations against Uyghurs.

UHRP has published reports on the CCP's policies regarding all aspects of Uyghur human rights, including cultural rights, such as "Kashgar Coerced: Forced Reconstruction, Exploitation, and Surveillance in the Cradle of Uyghur Culture," and "Extracting Cultural Resources: the Exploitation and Criminalization of Uyghur Cultural Heritage."

See also
East Turkestan independence movement
World Uyghur Congress
Uyghur American Association
Uyghur genocide

References

External links
 Uyghur Human Rights Project website

Central Asian American culture
East Turkestan independence movement
Political advocacy groups in the United States
Asian-American culture in Washington, D.C.
Organizations established in 2004
Turkic diaspora in North America
Uyghur diaspora
Uyghurs
2004 establishments in the United States